Crateva adansonii is a species of small tree in the family Capparaceae.  It is widely distributed in Africa and Asia and may be called the "sacred barna" in India or bún trái đỏ (mắt núi) in Vietnam.

Subspecies 
The Catalogue of Life lists:
 C. adansonii adansonii (Africa)
 C. adansonii f. axillaris (southern India, Sri Lanka, Malesia)
 C. adansonii odora (India, Indo-China)

Gallery

References

External links 

Capparaceae
Trees of Asia